Cochranella nola is a species of frog in the family Centrolenidae, the glass frogs, so named because of the transparent skin on the underside of the abdomen through which the internal organs can be seen. This species is endemic to Bolivia where it is found in the Andean foothills in the Santa Cruz Department. Its natural habitats are subtropical or tropical moist montane forests and rivers. The scientific name nola is Latin for "small bell", and refers to the high-pitched, bell-like call of the male in the breeding season.

Description
Cochranella nola is a small arboreal species of glass frog. This frog has a truncated snout and vomerine teeth, widely-separated eyes and small, indistinct tympani. The dorsal surface and flanks are finely granulated while the hands and feet are smooth. The limbs are slender, the digits having adhesive toepads; there is extensive webbing between fingers III and IV, and between the toes. The dorsal surface and flanks of this frog are a uniform green with fine white speckling; the ventral surface is white, the hind part being transparent, enabling the yellow intestines to be seen. The upper lip is white, the tongue is green and the iris is white, with dark reticulations, and a horizontal pupil. The bones are dark green.

Distribution and habitat
In 2013, the first record of its presence in Peru was recorded, it having been found in Bahuaja-Sonene National Park in the southeast of the country.

Ecology
In the breeding season, males call from near fast-flowing streams, either from rocks in the streambed, or from foliage up to a few meters above the water. Up to six males may call in chorus, spaced out a few centimetres apart. The calls are either single high-pitched "pinks" at irregular intervals, or groups of three "pinks" in quick succession. Females lay clutches of eggs on wet boulders.

Status
In its limited range in Bolivia, this species is common, but it is threatened by pollution of the streams where it breeds which can suffer from agricultural run-off, and the International Union for Conservation of Nature has rated it as "near-threatened". Now that it has been recorded from a further location in Peru, this frog's conservation status may need to be reassessed.

References

Cochranella
Amphibians of Bolivia
Endemic fauna of Bolivia
Taxonomy articles created by Polbot
Amphibians described in 1996